Samuel Fowler (October 30, 1779, at Newburgh, Orange County, New York, United States – February 20, 1844, at Franklin, Sussex County, New Jersey) was a doctor, state legislator, and member of the United States House of Representatives from northwestern New Jersey. As the owner of zinc and iron mines and an iron works at Franklin, New Jersey, he became a noted mineralogist who discovered several varieties of rare minerals (chiefly various ores of zinc).

Biography
Born in Newburg, New York on October 30, 1779, Fowler was the son of John Fowler and Glorianna Fowler. He attended the Montgomery Academy and subsequently graduated from Pennsylvania Medical College. He began to practice medicine in 1800 in Hamburg, New Jersey. In 1827, Fowler became a member of the New Jersey Legislative Council (precursor to the New Jersey Senate), and was elected as a Jacksonian Democrat to House of Representatives, serving in the Twenty-third and Twenty-fourth United States Congresses (March 4, 1833 – March 3, 1837)

Fowler died on February 20, 1844, in Franklin, New Jersey and was interred in the North Church Cemetery in Hardyston Township, New Jersey.

Fowler was the father of Colonel Samuel Fowler (1818–1863), an officer with the 15th New Jersey Volunteer Infantry Regiment during the American Civil War and grandfather of Samuel Fowler (1851–1919), who served in the House of Representatives from 1889 to 1893.

External links

 

1779 births
1844 deaths
American mineralogists
Members of the New Jersey Legislative Council
People from Franklin, New Jersey
Jacksonian members of the United States House of Representatives from New Jersey
19th-century American politicians